David Nalbandian was the defending champion, but lost in the first round to Tim Henman.

Roger Federer won in the final 6–4, 7–5, against Andy Roddick.

Players

Draw

Main draw

Play-offs

External links
Official Kooyong Classic website
2005 Kooyong Classic results

Kooyong Classic
Com